Bubbio may refer to:
 Bubbio, a comune in the Province of Asti in the Italian region Piedmont
 Diego Bubbio, Italian philosopher and Associate Professor of Philosophy at Western Sydney University
 Teodoro Bubbio, Italian politician